Sieger Suárez Architectural Partnership is a Miami based firm specializing in the diversified field of luxury high-rise residential design and development. It is jointly owned and managed by Charles M. Sieger and José J. Suárez. 

The firm has designed in excess of US $10 billion worth of residential real estate properties.  The firm is one of the pioneers of the "floor through see through" unit design, one of the most successful design concepts in the high-rise residential market. Most of its activities are in the Southeast United States.

It has a number of divisions devoted to a variety of branches of architecture in addition to marketing and advertising

History 
The Sieger Suárez Architectural Partnership evolved from the firm formerly known as Charles M. Sieger Architects, Inc., which Sieger founded in 1974. In 1987 Charles Sieger entered into a partnership with José J. Suárez, who joined the firm in 1980. In 1998 the firm officially changed its name to The Sieger Suarez Architectural Partnership.

The firm stepped into development in 2003 with the formation of BSG Development Corporation. Partners Charles Sieger and José Suárez formed BSG by merging their design talents with real estate developer and investor Ronald Bloomberg, General Contractor Ronald I. Gaines, and CFO Javier Henriques. Along with affiliate companies GS2 Corporation (general contracting), EGS2 Corporation (landscape architecture), and The IMPACT Agency (marketing and advertising), BSG Development is a full-service real estate development company with total in-house control.

Corporate Clients 
Trump Organization 
Starwood (defunct)

Selected projects
50 Biscayne, Miami
St. Regis Resort Residences, Bal Harbour, Miami
Brickell House
Centro Lofts, Miami
Trump Towers, Sunny Isles Beach

References

External links
Official website

Architecture firms based in Florida
Companies based in Miami